Montezuma National Wildlife Refuge is a wildlife preserve operated by the United States Fish and Wildlife Service, encompassing part of the Montezuma Swamp at the north end of Cayuga Lake. The  preserve is composed of swamps, pools and channels and is a stopping point for migratory birds.

Most of the refuge lies in the Town of Tyre, in the northeast corner of Seneca County.

The Montezuma Marshes were designated a National Natural Landmark in May 1973; the citation notes that "A small, 100-acre area within the site is one of the best examples of undisturbed swamp woodlands in New York or New England."

The New York Northern Montezuma Wildlife Management Area borders the national wildlife refuge and protects additional parts of the Montezuma Swamp.

A significant spot along the Atlantic Flyway, the Refuge provides crucial habitat for migratory waterfowl and other birds.

Fauna

Marsh and water birds found at the refuge include the great blue heron, green-backed heron, great egret, black-crowned night-heron, Virginia rail, sora, bitterns, common moorhen and pied-billed grebes.

The refuge also has an area where bald eagles have been nesting in recent years.
Ducks and geese, including Canada geese, snow geese, black ducks and mallards are common at the refuge.

Mammalian species that roam this refuge include raccoon, coyote, muskrat, squirrel, red fox, chipmunk, beaver, gray fox and bats.

History
The Finger Lakes Region was formed by the melting glaciers of the last glacial period, over ten thousand years ago. The northern and southern ends of the lakes gradually developed into extensive marshes. First the Algonquin Indians and later the Cayugas of the Iroquois Nation were the earliest known inhabitants to reap the rewards of the bountiful life in the marsh. The name "Montezuma" was first used in 1806 when Dr. Peter Clark named his hilltop home "Montezuma" after the palace of the Aztec Emperor Montezuma in Mexico City. Eventually the Marsh, the Village, and the Refuge all acquired the name.

There were no dramatic changes in the marsh until the development of the Erie Canal in the 19th century, when it became apparent that feeder canals from Seneca Lake and Cayuga Lake would in time link these lakes with the main line. With canal construction, there arose the possibility of draining the marshes, and an act was passed relative to the draining of the Cayuga Marshes. Work first began on the canal system on July 4, 1817, and the completion was marked by the first passage from Lake Erie to New York City on October 26, 1825. Construction of the Seneca-Cayuga canal began in 1818 and by 1828 boats passed from Geneva to the Erie Canal at Montezuma. The Erie Canal did not greatly affect the marshes as the Seneca River still flowed directly from Cayuga Lake into the marshes.

In 1910, the widening and reconstruction of the Seneca and Cayuga extension of the New York State Barge Canal altered the marshes. A lock was built at the north end of Cayuga Lake and a dam was constructed at the outlet of the lake. The meandering rivers were straightened and deepened, thereby creating additional drainage-ways.

In 1937 the Bureau of Biological Survey, which later became the US Fish and Wildlife Service, purchased  of the former marsh. The Civilian Conservation Corps began work on a series of low dikes which would hold water and restore part of the marsh habitat that had once existed.

The refuge was opened in 1938 as the Montezuma Migratory Bird Refuge. President Franklin D. Roosevelt signed Executive Order 7971 which established the Bird Refuge on September 12, 1938.
The refuge provides a stopping point for waterfowl and other migratory birds.  The refuge restored marsh land lost to drainage from the construction of the Cayuga and Seneca Canal that linked the Finger Lakes to the Erie Canal.

In May 1973, the refuge was designated as the Montezuma Marshes National Natural Landmark by the Secretary of the Department of the Interior.

On September 22, 2000, "Harmony With Nature" — an eight-person team of musicians from around the country - performed a four-hour, afternoon/evening concert at the refuge, featuring the music of the late John Denver. The speakers and musicians/performers (from across the country) were: Pete Lee Baker, Tom Jasikoff (Montezuma NWR's manager), Tim Bak, Rob Bidinger, Val Cooper, Frank DeLaMarre, Paul Swanton and Brian Taylor (who also served as emcee of the event). The idea for the performance was the brainchild and collective efforts of both Baker and Jasikoff, which actually culminated in a series of "Harmony With Nature" concerts by the group, held on this and other Federally-protected land over 2000-01 (four concerts in total, counting Montezuma NWR). This concert at Montezuma NWR marked the first time that a musical performance had ever been held on federally-protected wildlife land. These musicians donated their talents and time by joining together to promote Denver’s legacy and to continue supporting his lifelong commitment to ensuring the preservation of the earth and all its natural habitats. The fund-raising efforts also benefitted Montezuma NWR and the other wildlife sanctuaries, supporting and celebrating wildlife conservation efforts, ecological awareness, environmental education and habitat protection. This particular groundbreaking, historic concert was covered in a Friday, September 22, 2000 (the day of the concert) article on page A-6 of The Citizen (Auburn, N.Y.) newspaper, by staff writer Kelly Willard and a subsequent picture from the concert by staff photographer Cydney Scott followed the article. Baker and Jasikoff also appeared in local, in-studio television interviews regarding the event.

On September 24, 2017, another "Harmony With Nature" event was held there, with Rebecca Colleen, Bill Destler, Jim Clare and Perry Cleaveland providing a two-hour, afternoon music show at the refuge.

Public access
In addition to providing wildlife habitat, the refuge also provides opportunities for people to observe wildlife. The refuge is open during daylight hours seven days a week.

The  Wildlife Drive is a one-way auto tour that provides many opportunities to observe and photograph wildlife. The main feature of the drive is the  wetland which hosts a rich diversity of waterfowl, waterbirds and other wildlife. The drive is open most of the year with the exception of winter, when the road may not be passable.

The  Esker Brook Trail and the  Oxbow Trail are available to hikers and walkers. A visitor center and gift shop are open from April 1 to December 1 and have educational brochures, exhibits and specimens about the refuge and its wildlife.

The New York State Thruway passes through the north end of the preserve providing passing motorists with a glimpse of the preserve as they speed along the Thruway. A 22-foot steel statue of a bald eagle, dedicated in 2016 to mark the 40th anniversary of the Bald Eagle Restoration program in New York State, is visible from the Thruway.

See also
 List of National Wildlife Refuges
 List of National Natural Landmarks in New York

References

External links

 Montezuma National Wildlife Refuge webpage
 New York State's Northern Montezuma Wildlife Management Area webpage
 Friends of the Montezuma Wetlands Complex

National Wildlife Refuges in New York (state)
National Natural Landmarks in New York (state)
U.S. Route 20
Protected areas of Seneca County, New York
Protected areas of Wayne County, New York
Protected areas of Cayuga County, New York
Wetlands of New York (state)
Landforms of Seneca County, New York
Landforms of Wayne County, New York
Landforms of Cayuga County, New York